Cayetana Guillén Cuervo (born 13 June 1969) is a Spanish actress, journalist and TV presenter.

Early life and background 
Born on 13 June 1969 in Madrid, both of her parents, Fernando Guillén and Gemma Cuervo as well as her brother, Fernando are also actors. She studied Communication Sciences at the Complutense University of Madrid and, since 1998, she has been the presenter of a weekly program on Televisión Española, Versión Española, where a Spanish-language movie is shown and discussed.

Professional career 
Cayetana began her acting career at the end of the 1980s, first in television and in theatre soon after. She debuted in 1986 with a small role in the television series Segunda enseñanza, written by Ana Diosdado and directed by Pedro Masó.

In 1987 she played a small role in the theatre production Coqueluche by Roberto Romero. During the following years, Cayetana dedicated herself to theatre but with occasional appearances in television programmes as well as series from the 1990s onwards.  Her first appearance on the big screen was in 1989 in La luna negra, directed by Imanol Uribe.

At the beginning of the 1990s she starred in four different theatre plays: Entre bobos anda el juego (1991) and Thriller imposible (1992) were both produced by the theatre company Strion; later on she would also appear in La gran sultana (1993) and Fuenteovejuna (1993), produced by the Compañía Nacional de Teatro Clásico.

Her appearances in theatre lessened in the second half of the 1990s, and she devoted herself to the film industry. In this successful period  Cayetana worked on the well-known films All About My Mother, The Wound of Light and The Grandfather where she worked with her father. Thanks to her role in The Grandfather, which was nominated for the Academy Award, she was nominated for the Spanish Goya Award for Best Actress.

She made her debut as a TV presenter in 1998 in the national television channel Televisión Española. She also works as a presenter in culture programmes on this channel, or more specifically, Seventh-Art programmes like Versión Española, running from 1998, where she interviewed the members of the technical and artistic team of a film that had been displayed before.

In the 2000s and 2010s, she works both as a TV presenter and actress (film industry and theatre), as well as a journalist in the Spanish newspaper El Mundo.

Since 2015, she has played the main role of Irene Larra in the successful television series El Ministerio del Tiempo.

In 2016  she participated in the worldwide known show MasterChef Celebrity, in the first edition. Miguel Ángel Muñoz was the winner and Guillén Cuervo the runner-up.

In 2018 she participated in Cero en Historia, TV show hosted by Joaquín Reyes.

Filmography

Film

Television

Stage

Awards 
Premio del Círculo de Escritores Cinematográficos for El abuelo.
Premio en la Mostra de Cine de Valencia a la mejor interpretación femenina for Hazlo por mi.

References

External links

Articles about Cayetana Guillén Cuervo at El País (in Spanish)

1969 births
Living people
Spanish television presenters
Spanish film actresses
Spanish television actresses
Actresses from Madrid
Spanish women television presenters
20th-century Spanish actresses
21st-century Spanish actresses